Frank Stephen Baldwin (April 10, 1838 – April 8, 1925) was an American who invented a pinwheel calculator in 1875.  He started the design of a new machine in 1905 and was able to finalize its design with the help of Jay R. Monroe who eventually bought the exclusive rights to the machine and started the Monroe Calculating Machine Company to manufacture it.

Early years

He was born on April 10, 1838 in New Hartford, Connecticut. In 1840 the family moved to Nunda, New York where he attended the Nunda Institute for elementary school. In 1854 he was enrolled at Union College in Schenectady, New York, but left when his father had an accident that left him as an invalid for the rest of his life. Frank then took over the management of his father's architectural business. In 1855, Frank applied for a patent on an "arrowhead self-coupler" for railroad cars, but the patent was rejected.

In 1860 an uncle in Carlyle, Illinois, designed a corn-planter and Frank assisted in applying for the patent. In 1861, he returned to Carlyle to build a model of the planter and to arrange manufacturing. During the American Civil War he enlisted in the Carlyle Home Guard, but only served for three months. In 1869, he went to St. Louis, Missouri as manager of Peck's Planning Mills.

It was around this time, that he invented an anemometer, for recording the direction of the wind. He also invented a "registering step" for street cars, that recorded the number of passengers entering a streetcar; and a "street indicator" geared from the axle of a trolley that showed each street in succession, from an illuminated box, as the car passed.

Shortly thereafter, he invented and patented the "Recording Lumber Measure", a machine which automatically measured and recorded four different kinds of lumber at the same time. This device started him thinking about calculating machines and this point really marks the birth of the Monroe calculator. In the office of a life insurance company at St. Louis, he had seen an arithmometer, a calculating machine devised by Charles Xavier Thomas around 1820 and which, at the time, was the only mechanical desktop calculator in commercial production. To create a model based on his ideas he hired William Seward Burroughs I to perform the work in his machine shop, which he, with his father, had in St. Louis.

Marriage
In October 1872, he married Mary K. Denniston of Williamsport, Pennsylvania. She was visiting relatives in St. Louis when they met. Together they had seven children: Frank Pardee Baldwin (1873–1946) who was born in Philadelphia; Emma Virginia Baldwin (1877–1952) who was born in St. Louis, and worked as a librarian at the public library; Eugene Denniston Baldwin (1880–?) who was born in St. Louis, and worked as an insurance clerk; George Howard Baldwin (1890–1950); Lillian Isabel Baldwin (1886–1916); and Blanche Baker Baldwin (1891–1969) who was born in New Jersey, and worked as a clerk at the YMCA.

In 1873 they moved to Philadelphia where he made ten of his calculating machines. When the calculating machine was finished, he sold one to the office of the Pennsylvania Railroad and was referred to George M. Taylor, Auditor of Freight Receipts. He then designed an adding machine called the "arithmometer" and his patent was issued on July 28, 1874. It was one of the first adding machines sold in the United States.

He placed both of his calculators on exhibition at the Franklin Institute, and he was awarded the John Scott Medal for the "most meritorious invention" of the year.

Europe
Wilgott Theophil Odhner developed a similar pinwheel machine also based on Thomas' arithmometer and took out patents in all European countries and in the United States in 1878.  It took him another 12 years to perfect the design so that it could be manufactured effectively. In 1890 his workshop soon followed by several large manufacturing companies in Europe started production. His machine, called Odhner's Arithmometer then appeared under ten to fifteen names in Europe, the most important being Brunsviga and Triumpator, which were manufactured in Germany.

Monroe
In 1900, he patented the "Baldwin Computing Engine", a machine by which multiplication or division was performed by one stroke for each digit. In 1908, he was awarded a patent on the "Baldwin Recording Calculator", which combined a printer with the calculator. In 1911, he partnered with Jay R. Monroe, of the Western Electric Company in New York City to create the Monroe Calculator Company. In 1920 he was living in East Orange, New Jersey with his wife and children.

Death
Baldwin died at age 86 in 1925 in a private hospital in Morristown, New Jersey following an operation.

References

External links

Baldwin calculator brochure

Patents
; Adding Machines; July 28, 1874
; Cryptographic device; November 20, 1877
; Cement mixer; May 12, 1891
; Roundabout; June 7, 1892
; Calculating machine; January 9, 1900
; Calculating machine; August 5, 1902

1838 births
1925 deaths
People from New Hartford, Connecticut
Mechanical calculators
People from Denville, New Jersey
People from East Orange, New Jersey
People from Nunda, New York
Union College (New York) alumni
People from Carlyle, Illinois